A raffee sail is a triangular topsail carried aboard certain sailing ships.  Originally used in Ancient Rome to maneuver ships at sea, the raffee was eventually implemented as a downwind sail set below a square-rigged yard to fill in areas needed for light airs.  In later pilot schooners, it was a triangular sail set above a yard from the masthead.  Today a "raffee" is any square downwind sail set off the mast at a right angle.

References

 Sailing rigs and rigging